The Cannonball Adderley Quintet at the Lighthouse is a live album by jazz saxophonist Cannonball Adderley released on the Riverside label featuring a performance by Adderley with Nat Adderley, Victor Feldman, Sam Jones and Louis Hayes.

Reception

The AllMusic review by Scott Yanow awarded the album 4 stars and states that "a fine all-around set from the Cannonball Adderley Quintet... finds his band in top form... It's a strong introduction to the music of this classic hard bop group".  The Penguin Guide to Jazz awarded the album 4 stars, stating: "At the Lighthouse, which marked Vic Feldman's arrival in the group, is a near-classic, opening on the immortal version of 'Sack O' Woe' and steaming through a vintage Adderley set in front of a cheering and fingersnapping crowd".

Track listing 
 "Sack O' Woe" (Julian "Cannonball" Adderley) - 10:45
 "Big 'P'" (Jimmy Heath) - 5:55
 "Blue Daniel" (Frank Rosolino) - 7:31
 "Azule Serape" (Victor Feldman) - 9:29
 "Exodus" (Feldman) - 7:40
 "What Is This Thing Called Love?" (Cole Porter) - 4:48
 "Our Delight" (Tadd Dameron) - 6:54
 Recorded at the Lighthouse Café, Hermosa Beach, CA on October 16, 1960

Personnel 
 Cannonball Adderley - alto saxophone
 Nat Adderley - cornet
 Victor Feldman - piano
 Sam Jones - bass
 Louis Hayes - drums

References 

Albums produced by Orrin Keepnews
1960 live albums
Cannonball Adderley live albums
Riverside Records live albums
Nat Adderley live albums